is a retired Japanese professional racing driver who drove in Formula One for the Williams-Toyota team from  to . In 2012 and 2014, he won the Super Formula Championship driving for TOM'S. Racing for Toyota Gazoo Racing, he won the 2018, 2019 and 2020 24 Hours of Le Mans, as well as the 2018–19 World Endurance Championship along with team-mates Fernando Alonso and Sébastien Buemi. He is the second FIA world champion from Japan after Toshi Arai.

Racing career

Before Formula One
Born in Okazaki, Aichi, Nakajima is the son of the retired Formula One driver Satoru Nakajima. His younger brother, Daisuke, is also a racing driver. Nakajima started his career in racing in 1996, when he started karting. Three years later, he was crowned the Suzuka Formula ICA karting champion. After some impressive performances, Nakajima was picked up by Japanese car manufacturer Toyota as part of the corporation's Young Drivers Program.

His father had been backed by Toyota's arch-rivals Honda through his career. Nakajima hoped that by joining Toyota he would shield himself against any accusations that his father had promoted his career.

In 2002, Nakajima won a scholarship in Formula Toyota, which he became champion in a year later. He progressed onto Japanese Formula Three in 2004, winning two of the 20 races and finishing fifth in the Drivers' Championship.

Nakajima stayed in Japanese Formula Three for 2005, finishing second. He dovetailed that championship with appearances in the Japanese GT300 sports car series, where he ended the year eighth.

Nakajima moved to the Formula Three Euroseries in 2006 and competed against the likes of Sebastian Vettel and Paul di Resta. After starting the year strongly with second place in the first race and a win in round four, Nakajima finished seventh with 36 points, behind his Manor Motorsport teammates Kohei Hirate (third) and Esteban Guerrieri (fourth). The championship was won by di Resta with 86 points.

Nakajima's debut in a Formula One car came at Fuji Speedway during November 2006, where he completed four demonstration laps in wet conditions.

Nakajima raced in the GP2 series in 2007 for the DAMS team alongside French 2005–06 A1 Grand Prix winner Nicolas Lapierre. Nakajima also served as Williams' test driver, completing 7,000 km of testing for the team.

Nakajima's first year in GP2 finished with no wins, but five consecutive podiums and ended the year as top rookie. Nakajima's fifth in the championship put him comfortably ahead of Lapierre. Nakajima was found to have caused a collision in Istanbul, when he hit leader Karun Chandhok during the sprint race, and was given a drive-through penalty.

Formula One

It was announced on 9 October 2007 that following the retirement of Alexander Wurz, Nakajima would race for Williams in the season finale in Brazil. Nakajima finished tenth in the race, setting the fifth fastest lap – quicker than his teammate Nico Rosberg, who finished fourth.

At his first pit stop, Nakajima overshot his box and hit two of his mechanics. The mechanics were taken to hospital for precautionary checks. Nakajima apologised for the error: "First of all I would say I'm really sorry that some of my mechanics were injured during my pitstop and that I hope they're OK. It was a good first race for me but it was slightly overshadowed."

Patrick Head commented: "Kazuki drove well on his debut. His lap times were impressive and he's set a marker for a future in Formula One. Some of our mechanics were injured today, they're having some checks done now and we send our best wishes to them."

On 7 November it was confirmed by Williams that Nakajima would partner Rosberg at the Williams team for the 2008 season. He had a successful start to 2008 at the Australian Grand Prix, finishing seventh but promoted to sixth after Rubens Barrichello was disqualified, even whilst knocking Robert Kubica out of the race and being penalised. He then finished seventh in the Spanish Grand Prix, having outqualified his teammate. A first-corner incident with Giancarlo Fisichella at Istanbul forced him to retire. Nakajima scored two points at Monaco where no Japanese Formula One driver had previously scored a point, and retired from the 2008 Canadian Grand Prix after hitting the pit wall when pitting for a new front wing. Nakajima scored another point at the 2008 British Grand Prix, after losing seventh place on the last lap. In Singapore, Nakajima made it to the third qualifying round for the first time qualifying 10th on the grid. He went on to finish eighth and scored a point.

Nakajima was retained by Williams for the 2009 season. At the 2009 Australian Grand Prix he crashed into the wall at turn six, putting him out of the race. Nakajima was the only driver to retire at Bahrain, stopping five laps before the end with overheated oil. He also crashed on the penultimate lap of the Monaco Grand Prix whilst running in 10th place. He came close to scoring at several Grands Prix, including losing a points finish after being delayed in the pit lane at the Turkish Grand Prix. At the British Grand Prix, Nakajima secured his highest ever Formula One grid slot, qualifying in an impressive fifth place ahead of world championship leader Jenson Button. However, his race was compromised by poor pit strategy, and he eventually finished outside the points. Nakajima once again nearly scored at the Hungarian Grand Prix, finishing just 0.7 seconds behind eighth place Jarno Trulli. He finished ninth again in Singapore. At Brazil Nakajima was once again in contention for points until being taken out by rookie and fellow countryman Kamui Kobayashi. Nakajima finished the season having scored no points, with his teammate Nico Rosberg being single-handedly responsible for every championship point scored by the Williams team, with Nakajima being the only non points scorer out of the drivers who took part in each race in 2009.

Williams signed Rubens Barrichello and Nico Hülkenberg for 2010, leaving Nakajima without a seat. However, in January, reports tied Nakajima to team Stefan GP, which had consolidated remnants of the Toyota F1 team after the Japanese manufacturer's withdrawal from the sport in late 2009. Stefan duly confirmed on 19 February 2010 that Nakajima was one of the team's drivers, although the team did not have an entry to the 2010 Formula One season. The FIA subsequently ruled that Stefan GP could not be entered for the season at such a late stage, so Nakajima was left with no drive in Formula One for 2010.

Formula Nippon / Super Formula

After a successful test in late 2010, Nakajima moved back to the Japanese racing scene by competing in Formula Nippon for 2011. Driving for the TOM'S team, he won his first race at the second round of the season, held at Autopolis, which also moved him into the lead of the drivers' standings. He ultimately finished runner-up to André Lotterer. He continued in the series for the 2012 season winning the title. In the 2013 season he could not defend his Super Formula title finishing 4th overall. However, in the 2014 season he regained the title with his Petronas Team TOM'S team. In the 2015 season he ended up 2nd overall.

His younger brother, Daisuke, competed in the series until 2017.

Super GT

Nakajima first competed in the Japanese Super GT series in 2005, driving a Toyota MR-S in the GT300 class with Minoru Tanaka. He returned to the category in 2011, driving a Lexus SC430 in the GT500 class with Formula Nippon rival Lotterer. For 2012 he continued to drive a SC430, now partnered with Loïc Duval. In 2013 he partnered with James Rossiter, scoring two wins and a third-place finish to rank third in the drivers standings. In 2014 he drove a Lexus RC F with Rossiter, winning two races.

The driver returned to the Japanese Super GT in 2017 with a TOM's Lexus LC.

FIA World Endurance Championship

In 2012, Nakajima was selected by Toyota to be one of the drivers for its assault on the 24 Hours of Le Mans race and the FIA World Endurance Championship, driving the prototype Toyota TS030 Hybrid. At Le Mans, he hit the Nissan DeltaWing hard enough to knock it off the circuit, causing substantial damage to the Nissan, and significant damage to his own car — neither car finished the race. He finished runner-up at the 2012 6 Hours of Silverstone. At the 2012 6 Hours of Fuji, Nakajima took pole position for Toyota before triple stinting in the race to bring home the TS030's second win in competition and Nakajima's first with the team.

Nakajima continued as Toyota LMP1 part-time driver the next two seasons. He won the 2013 6 Hours of Fuji, a race cancelled with no laps under green flag. In 2014 he finished second at Silverstone, Fuji and Shanghai.

The Japanese became a Toyota LMP1 full-time driver for the 2015 FIA World Endurance Championship, scoring a third place at Silverstone as best result. In 2016 he scored a third-place finish at Shanghai.

Nakajima began the 2017 season with two wins at Silverstone and Spa.

Nakajima won the 2018 Le Mans 24 Hours race in the #8 Toyota, along with Fernando Alonso and Sébastian Buemi.

Nakajima, Buemi and Alonso then repeated the achievement in 2019, at the same time clinching the 2018–19 FIA World Endurance Championship, making Nakajima the second Japanese FIA world champion after Toshi Arai.

Nakajima retired from racing after the 2021 FIA World Endurance Championship to take on the role of vice-chairman at Toyota Gazoo Racing Europe, with Ryō Hirakawa taking over his seat.

Racing record

Career summary

Complete Macau Grand Prix results

Complete Formula 3 Euro Series results
(key) (Races in bold indicate pole position; races in italics indicate fastest lap)

Complete GP2 Series results
(key) (Races in bold indicate pole position) (Races in italics indicate fastest lap)

Complete Formula One results
(key) (Races in bold indicate pole position; races in italics indicate fastest lap)

† Did not finish, but was classified as he had completed more than 90% of the race distance.

Complete Super GT results
(key) (Races in bold indicate pole position) (Races in italics indicate fastest lap)

‡ Half points awarded as less than 75% of race distance was completed.

Complete Formula Nippon/Super Formula results
(key) (Races in bold indicate pole position; races in italics indicate fastest lap)

Complete 24 Hours of Le Mans results

Complete FIA World Endurance Championship results

Footnotes

External links

 Official website
 Career statistics
 

1985 births
Japanese racing drivers
Japanese Formula One drivers
Williams Formula One drivers
GP2 Series drivers
Japanese Formula 3 Championship drivers
Formula 3 Euro Series drivers
Super GT drivers
Living people
People from Okazaki, Aichi
Formula Nippon drivers
24 Hours of Le Mans drivers
24 Hours of Le Mans winning drivers
FIA World Endurance Championship drivers
Super Formula drivers
TOM'S drivers
Manor Motorsport drivers
DAMS drivers
Toyota Gazoo Racing drivers